Coptosia minuta is a species of beetle in the family Cerambycidae. It was described by Maurice Pic in 1892, originally under the genus Phytoecia. It is known from Turkey and Syria.

References

Saperdini
Beetles described in 1892